Giang Le-Huy (Vietnamese: Lê-Huy Giang) was born in Saigon, South Vietnam. Giang left her homeland in 1975. She then lived in various countries before settling in Australia. She has been living in South Australia since 1985.

Acting career
Giang first entered the Australian film industry in 1998 as an actor in a film entitled  "Spank" and then in "Peaches" (2002) and "Swing" (2007). "Swing" received the Best Film Award for 2007 at St Kilda Film Festival. In "Swing", Giang acted as well as played zither in the background for a small part of the film.

In addition to acting, Giang does voice work on the radio. In 2007 together with other casts, Giang’s voice sounded in the "Songs in the Blood" produced by the Radio Adelaide. The "Songs in the Blood" won a Silver medal in the New York Festival.

Education and community work
Giang studied and worked in the banking industry in Vietnam. Since the early years of her life, Giang had been interested in acting. After deciding to permanently settle in Australia, Giang attended a drama course in South Australia. Giang continued studying and received formal training. She worked in various areas including Couple Therapy, Financial Counselling, Family Support and Australian Migration Law while tirelessly and voluntarily helping refugees and migrants settle in South Australia.

As an active advocate for women in various areas including employment, health, recreation and life styles, Giang took up and successfully completed a post graduate course in Women’s Studies at the University of Adelaide.

As registered with the Migration Agents Registration Authority, Giang provided free advice to refugees and migrants on the Australian Migration law from 1992 until she retired from this industry at the end of 2006. Giang still advocates for women, practises as a qualified Couple Therapist and helps the community in her capacity as a Justice of the Peace. for South Australia.

Between 1990 and 2008, Giang was employed as a Multicultural Services Program Co-ordinator for a community welfare agency in Adelaide, managing and training cultural staff from Spain, Afghanistan, Chile, Iran, Iraq, Eritrea, Ethiopia, Sudan, Germany, Poland, Bosnia, Cambodia, Albania, Russia etc. providing various services to their own communities. In addition to that, in 1998, Giang created an annual Multicultural Festival, for refugees and migrants to showcase and maintain their cultures in Australia; and speed up their settlement.

After spending more than 20 years in  assisting many ethnic people and communities in the social and welfare work in South Australia, Giang left paid work in late 2008 to pursue a new path in Metaphysics and Complementary and Alternative Medicine with all its various holistic therapies.

Awards
In 2003, Giang was awarded a Centenary Medal by the Governor-General of Australia for her services, particularly in  the social and welfare service to refugee communities. In 2006, Giang received a Rotary International Outstanding Employee Award.

In Vietnamese literature, Giang appears under the pen name of Hoàng Huy Giang. Some of her popular stories are "Tà Áo Bay Bên Trời Quê Đất Khách" (re the history of the Vietnamese costume "Ao Dai") and "Trăng Vỡ Trên Đỉnh Hoàng Liên Sơn" (The moon broken on the summit of Mt Fansipan). Giang has published two Vietnamese poems and novels books entitled "Khi Người Ta Đang Yêu" (1997 – ) and "Màu Tím Pensée" (2004 – ).

References

External links

Australian film actresses
Vietnamese film actresses
Year of birth missing (living people)
Living people
People from Ho Chi Minh City
Vietnamese emigrants to Australia
Actresses of Vietnamese descent
Actresses from Adelaide
20th-century Vietnamese actresses
21st-century Vietnamese actresses